Kristína Kabátová (born June 4, 1992 in Bratislava, Slovakia) is a Slovak pair skater. She previously competed with Martin Hanulák. They were the 2006 Slovakian junior national champions and placed 15th at the 2006 World Junior Figure Skating Championships.

External links
 

1992 births
Living people
Figure skaters from Bratislava
Slovak female pair skaters